St Thomas's Church in Marlborough Street, Dublin was a Church of Ireland parish church. It was replaced by a new church, St. Thomas's Church, Cathal Brugha Street, Dublin, in 1930.

The church

Establishment
St Thomas's Church was built in 1758-62 in Marlborough Street when the parish of St. Mary's was divided to cope with increased population. The architect of this church (and of St. Catherine's in Thomas Street) was Mr. John Smith. The design is modelled on Palladio's Il Redentore in Venice. £2000 was granted by Parliament for the building of the church, and later another thousand pounds to finish it off. At the time it was considered to have the most beautiful facade of any church in the city, built in the Palladian style similar to St Catherine's Church on Thomas Street. It was opened for worship in 1762.

Operation
In 1866 Rev. John Grainger from St. Thomas's, moved to the found the new Church in Sherrif Street, East Wall St. Barnabas' Church, Dublin.

Loss and replacement
The church was gutted by a fire in July 1922.  This fire, which destroyed most of Upper Sackville Street (now O'Connell Street), occurred during the Civil War. Although the main structure survived, the opportunity was taken to extend Gloucester Street (now Sean Mac Dermott Street) up to O'Connell Street, and the church had to be removed in 1926 to enable this.  The new St Thomas's Church was erected on the site of the former parochial hall, on an "island" site in Cathal Brugha Street, in 1930.  The foundation stone of the former church is retained in the new St Thomas's Church.

The parish
There were 17,108 inhabitants in St. Thomas's parish in 1825.

Burials
Edward Stratford, 2nd Earl of Aldborough

Notes

Sources

Churches completed in 1762
Former churches in the Republic of Ireland
Buildings and structures demolished in 1926
Church of Ireland churches in Dublin (city)
Burial sites of the Stratford family
1922 fires in Europe
Georgian architecture in Ireland
Demolished buildings and structures in Dublin